

The Sivel SD28 is an Italian two-seat aerobatic monoplane designed and built by Sivel Aeronautica. The SD28 is a low-wing monoplane with side-by-side seating for two and dual controls. The SD28 is powered by a nose-mounted Lycoming AEIO-320-D piston engine and has a fixed nosewheel landing gear.

Specifications

References

Notes

Bibliography

1990s Italian civil utility aircraft
Aerobatic aircraft
Low-wing aircraft
Single-engined tractor aircraft
Aircraft first flown in 1995